Ruehl No.925 was an upscale clothing brand owned by Abercrombie & Fitch, selling apparel, leather goods, and luxury goods. Themed after New York City's Greenwich Village, the store was meant to attract post-graduate individuals aged 22 to 35, competing primarily with J.Crew, Polo Ralph Lauren, and American Eagle Outfitters' equally short-lived spinoff Martin + Osa. Ruehl was the only brand in the Abercrombie portfolio that sold  clothing in the color black.

The first Ruehl No.925 stores opened on September 24, 2004 at Westfield Garden State Plaza in Paramus, New Jersey, Woodfield Mall in Schaumburg, Illinois, and at International Plaza and Bay Street in Tampa, Florida.

Similar to Abercrombie & Fitch's moose logo and Hollister Co.'s seagull, Ruehl featured a French bulldog named "Trubble" embroidered on its clothing and accessories.

On June 17, 2009, Abercrombie & Fitch announced it would cease operations of the Ruehl brand.

History

Conception
After the financial success of Hollister in 2000, Mike Jeffries began developing three additional retail concepts. The first of these to be revealed was Ruehl in September 2004. The first location opened at the International Plaza and Bay Street mall in Tampa, Florida, followed by Woodfield Mall in Chicago, and the third at the Garden State Plaza in Paramus, New Jersey. These stores were used to test the market before future expansion. While the clothing was similar to that of Abercrombie & Fitch, Ruehl was priced 22% higher.

Stores

Ruehl's storefront was meant to resemble a series of brownstone buildings, with concrete walkways, hedges, flower boxes, and iron gates at the front door. The interior was sectioned off into numerous bedrooms, living rooms, and conservatories meant to mimic the interior of a home. Bookshelves lined the "living room", chandeliers hung from the ceiling of the "bedrooms", portraits sat on the floor, tilted against walls, and a central hallway divided the store in half.

Locations
At the time of the concept's closure, Ruehl had 29 full-line store locations in the United States:

The brand also operated one off-mall accessories store, a  store at 370 Bleecker Street, New York City, New York.

Levi Strauss lawsuit
In July 2007, Levi Strauss & Co. filed a lawsuit against Abercrombie & Fitch for trademark infringement, alleging that Ruehl jeans and other products used Levi's trademarked pocket design of connected arches. Levi's filed a similar suit against Polo Ralph Lauren.

References

2000s fashion
Abercrombie & Fitch brands
Clothing brands of the United States
Defunct brands
Greenwich Village
Clothing companies established in 2004
Retail companies established in 2004
Retail companies disestablished in 2010
West Village
2004 establishments in Ohio
2010 disestablishments in Ohio
Defunct clothing retailers of the United States